Leonardo Franco (1942 – 1 December 2015)  was a Uruguayan musician, composer, and guitarist.

Founder of the Uruguayan group Los Iracundos, with his brother the composer, vocalist and arranger Eduardo Franco (1945–1989). The group formed in 1958 in Paysandu, Uruguay, and had six members: Eduardo Franco (singer, composer, arranger), his brother Leonardo Franco (first guitar), Juan Carlos Velasquez (drums), John Bosco Zabalo (second guitar), Hugo Burgess (bass, vocals and composer) and Jesus Maria Febrero (keyboards). The group gave more than fifty years to music, having a style of romantic music and Latin pop. The band was famous for songs such as "Tú con él," "Apróntate para vivir," and "Te lo pido de rodillas".

Leonardo Franco was the father of musician and guitarist Adam Franco, who was in charge of the second guitar in front of the formation of Los Iracundos.

Franco died on 1 December  2015 at age 73 in Guatemala, where the group was preparing for a concert as part of his tour. The group reported in a press conference that a tour was planned in Guatemala and will continue with the three concerts that were scheduled.

Discography
 Stop (1964)
 Sin palabras (1965)
 Con palabras (1965)
 El sonido de Los Iracundos (1965)
 Primeros en América (1966)
 En Estereofonía (1966)
 Los Iracundos en Roma (1967)
 La música de Los Iracundos (1967)
 La juventud (1968)
 Felicidad, felicidad (1968)
 Los Iracundos (1968)
 La lluvia terminó (1969)
 Los Iracundos para niños (1969)
 Los Iracundos (1969)
 Impactos (1970)
 Agua con amor (1971)
 Instrumental (1971)
 Lo mejor de Los Iracundos (1972)
 Te lo pido de rodillas (1973)
 Tango joven (1974)
 Y te has quedado sola (1974)
 Los Iracundos (1975)
 Los Iracundos (1976)
 Gol! (1977)
 Pasión y vida (1978)
 Amor y fe (1979)
 Incomparables (1980)
 Fue tormenta de verano (1981)
 40 grados (1982)
 Los Iracundos (1983)
 Tú con él (1984)
 Iracundos 86 (1986)
 20 Grandes 20 (1986)
 La Historia de Los Iracundos (1987)

Filmography
 Una ventana al éxito (1966)
 Ritmo, amor y juventud (1966)
 El galleguito de la cara sucia (1966)
 Este loco verano (1970)
 Balada para un mochilero (1971)
 Locos por la música (1980)

References

Uruguayan musicians
1942 births
2015 deaths